Arturo Valls Mollà (born 24 March 1975) is a Spanish actor, primarily featured in comedy roles, as well as television presenter. He became popular for his performance in the comedy series Camera Café from 2005 to 2009.

Biography 
Arturo Valls Mollà was born in Valencia on 24 March 1975. He started a degree in journalism, even if he dropped out later to work as a reporter. After working for Valencian local television Valencia Te Ve, he entered national-level television by joining Gran Wyoming's show  (CQC) in 1998. He left the show in 2002, working in shows such as X cuánto? and Licencia para mirar (FORTA) or UHF and Los Más on Antena 3. He returned to CQC in 2007 and later worked in Allá tú and Vaya tropa. From 2011 to 2021, he hosted the game show .

Filmography 

Film

Television

References 

Spanish game show hosts
21st-century Spanish male actors
Spanish male television actors
Spanish male film actors
1975 births
Living people
People from Valencia